Marc Fusco is an American film writer, director, and editor. He is known for the feature films Stealing Time (2004), My Uncle Rafael (2012), and The Samuel Project (2018).

Former long-time assistant to Steven Spielberg, Marc has been writing and directing for over twenty years. Recently his comedic drama The Samuel Project was purchased for worldwide distribution. The film was released theatrically in over 80 cities from 2018–2019 through the theatrical distribution company in8 Releasing that Fusco co-founded in 2018.

Notable films Fusco has edited include the suspense film Burn starring Josh Hutcherson and Suki Waterhouse, Confession starring Michael Ironside, the vampire horror-comedy Slayers starring Thomas Jane and Abigail Breslin, Dig starring Emile Hirsch and Thomas Jane, and The Samuel Project starring Hal Linden and Ryan Ochoa.

In 2020, Fusco launched a new production and film services company Nico Nazar Creative with filmmaker, actor, and playwright Vahik Pirhamzei. The company has worked on films starring Robert Dinero, Dustin Hoffman, Thomas Jane, Emile Hirsch, Malin Akerman, Abigail Breslin with clients such as MGM, Highland Film Group, Arclight Films, Saban Entertainment, Bondit Media, Saban Entertainment, Film Mode Entertainment, and Screen Media Films to name a few.

In 2012, Fusco’s award-winning comedy My Uncle Rafael was released theatrically in five markets and still holds the Pacific Theaters record for most sold out shows in a row, amassing over $250,000 on only four screens. Prior to My Uncle Rafael, Fusco directed and co-wrote the cult indie feature Stealing Time, starring Peter Facinelli, Scott Foley, Ethan Embry, and Jennifer Garner, which won multiple audience awards at several festivals and distributed worldwide.

After working in production at Amblin Entertainment in the late 1990s, Fusco was handpicked by Steven Spielberg to work closely as the director’s personal assistant. For over five years, he assisted the Academy Award-winning director on the films The Lost World: Jurassic Park, Amistad, Saving Private Ryan and also during the start-up of DreamWorks SKG—the first full-fledged studio to be created in over eighty years. During his tenure with Spielberg, Fusco and co-writer Chris Perkins sold the screenplay “The Reel Killers” to Dreamworks, the true story of the last silent movie theater in the world and its owner who was murdered by a gay, hustling serial killer. Fusco also directed the short film The Interview that premiered at the 1998 Venice International Film Festival.

In 2016, Marc co-founded the Drive Hope Foundation with the mission to expand the minds of underserved youth to consider careers outside of their own difficult circumstances.

In 2017, Fusco became engaged to famed recording artist/guitarist Malina Moye.

Filmography

Film

External links

References

American film directors
American film editors
21st-century American writers
Living people
Year of birth missing (living people)